Rachel Tzvia Back is an English-language Israeli poet, translator and professor of literature.

Biography

Born in Buffalo, New York, Rachel Tzvia Back was raised in the US and Israel. The seventh generation of her family in Israel, Back returned there for good in 1980. She has lived in the Galilee, in the north of the country, since 2000. Back studied at Yale University, Temple University, and received her PhD from the Hebrew University of Jerusalem. She is a professor of English literature and head of the graduate English track at Oranim Academic College.

Back has taught also at the Hebrew University, Bar-Ilan University and Tel-Aviv University, and has been guest writer at numerous US universities, including Columbia, Barnard, Princeton, Rutgers, NYU, Wesleyan, Williams and others. In 2009, she was a Brownstone Visiting Associate Professor at Dartmouth College. From 1995 to 2000, Back was the Israeli Academic and Administrative Director of the Wesleyan and Brown Universities Overseas Program in Israeli and Palestinian Studies, based in Jerusalem.

Literary career

Back's most recent poetry collection, What Use is Poetry, the Poet is Asking (2019), is described by University of California Berkeley professor Chana Kronfeld as “…the best work of this poet, translator, peace activist and scholar who reminds us, through the courageous beauty of her poems, that not to be political in these times is to collaborate with the forces of darkness.” This is poetry that is “necessary, irreplaceable, urgent,” writes Kronfeld, stating finally that this is “one of the best new books of poetry I have read in recent years.”

Back's previous collection, A Messenger Comes (2012), is described by the poet Irena Klepfisz as "poetry that, without apology, centers on grief and its faithful companion, memory"; according to poet Hank Lazer, this collection is "a harrowing & inspiring book of poems." Among her previous poetry collections is Litany (1995), Azimuth (2001), The Buffalo Poems (2003), and On Ruins & Return: Poems 1999-2005 (2005).

Poet Peter Cole noted of Azimuth that "with grace and gravity, with a gentle, quiet tenacity, Rachel Tzvia Back brings the poetics of indeterminacy to bear on Israel's over-determined landscape. Her verse hurts as the land itself has been hurt: its rippling music is delicate and achieved, its evocation of intimacy stunning." Back's subsequent poetry collections The Buffalo Poems and On Ruins & Return track the cycle of violence marking the lives of Palestinians and Israelis. Poet Andrew Mossin noted that "with its passionate interrogation and representation of the Palestinian-Israeli conflict, [Back's] work has its basis in personal, observed experience of a conflict that appears to be without end." Mossin also observed that Back's On Ruins & Return "continues the journey of her earlier volume, Azimuth, to inscribe in a poetry of psalmic intensity and astringent care the geographic, political and po-ethical realities of present-day Israel."

A noted and award-winning translator of Hebrew verse, Back's translations of the poetry of Tuvia Ruebner in In the Illuminated Dark: Select Poems of Tuvia Ruebner (2015) brought this critical Hebrew poet to the English world for the first time. In 2016, the collection was awarded the TLS-Risa Domb/Porjes prize; at the award-ceremony, noted British literary critic Boyd Tonkin spoke the following in his introductory words: "The miracle, if I may use that word, of Rachel Tzvia Back’s translations is that they somehow find an English voice - and one planted deep in the soil of Anglophone poetry - for this German spirit; a spirit that had already reinvented itself in Ruebner’s adopted language of Hebrew. That voice is always compelling and convincing, as these poems express a soaring beauty, tenderness and sorrow in the face of personal ordeals and historical catastrophe."

Her translations of preeminent Hebrew poet Lea Goldberg in Lea Goldberg: Selected Poetry and Drama were awarded a PEN Translation Grant, and the collection On the Surface of Silence: The Last Poems of Lea Goldberg, was shortlisted for the TLS-Risa Domb/Porjes Award in 2019. Back was also the editor and primary translator of the English edition of the groundbreaking anthology With an Iron Pen: Twenty Years of Hebrew Protest Poetry, which American poet Adrienne Rich referred to as "a historic collection." Additional books of translation include Night, Morning: Selected Poems of Hamutal Bar Yosef and work collected in The Defiant Muse: Hebrew Feminist Poetry from Antiquity to the Present (The Feminist Press, 1999) and Hebrew Writers on Writing (Trinity University Press, 2008).

In 2015, Back was a finalist for National Literary Translation Award in Poetry and the National Jewish Book Award in Poetry for the collection In the Illuminated Dark: Selected Poems of Tuvia Ruebner. That same year, Back delivered the Stronach Lecture at the University of Berkeley California, an address titled: "'This Bequest of Wings': On Teaching Poetry in a Region of Conflict."

In 2002, Back's critical monograph Led by Language: the Poetry and Poetics of Susan Howe, was published by University of Alabama Press.

Grants & awards

 2019 TLS-Risa Domb/Porjes Prize Shortlist (for On the Surface of Silence)
2016 TLS-Risa Domb/Porjes Prize Winner (for In the Illuminated Dark)
2015 National Translation Award Finalist
 2015 National Jewish Book Award Finalist
 2012 Dora Maar Fellowship of Brown Foundation Fellows Program
 2012 Translation Grant from the Rabinovich Foundation
 2008 Fundación Valparaíso Writer's Residence Award 	
 2006 Scholar's Travel Grant from the Ford Foundation	
 2006 Research Grant from the Sherman Institute
 2005 Hadassah-Brandeis Institute Research Award
 2005 PEN Translation Grant			
 2005 Blue Mountain Artists Residence Fellowship    	
 2000 Allan Bronfman Prize for Academic Excellence, Hebrew U.
 1996 Absorption Minister's Prize for Immigrant Writers

Works

Poetry
What Use is Poetry, the Poet is Asking (Shearsman Books, 2019)
A Messenger Comes (Singing Horse Press, 2012)
On Ruins & Return: Poems 1999-2005 (Shearsman Books, 2005)
 Azimuth (Sheep Meadow Press, 2001)
 Chapbooks: The Buffalo Poems (Duration Press, 2003) & Litany (Meow Press, 1995)

Translations
Now at the Threshold: The Late Poems of Tuvia Ruebner (HUC Press, 2020)
On the Surface of Silence: The Last Poems of Lea Goldberg (HUC Press, 2018)
In the Illuminated Dark: Selected Poems of Tuvia Ruebner (HUC Press, 2014)
 With an Iron Pen: Twenty Years of Hebrew Protest Poetry (SUNY Press, Excelsior Editions, 2009)
 Night, Morning: Poems by Hamutal Bar Yosef (Sheep Meadow Press, 2008)
 Lea Goldberg: Selected Poems & Drama (Toby Press, 2005)

Critical work
 Led by Language: the Poetry and Poetics of Susan Howe (University of Alabama Press, 2002)

External links
Poetry Society review of What Use is Poetry, the Poet is Asking
Marginalia/Los Angeles Review of Books Review of What Use is Poetry, the Poet is Asking
Rachel Tzvia Back on Poetry Foundation 
“A Measure of Splendor: Teaching Poetry for Social Change” (Symposium One Lecture, Hebrew Union College NYC, Oct. 2016) 
Essay in World Literature Today: “A Species of Magic: The Role of Poetry in Protest and Truth-telling (An Israeli Poet’s Perspective)”                
“After the War” poem with audio                                      
Marginalia / Los Angeles Review of Books Review of In the Illuminated Dark
 Jewish Book Council Review of In the Illuminated Dark 
 The Forward review of In the Illuminated Dark
 The Forward review of A Messenger Comes
 Review of A Messenger Comes
  Review of On Ruins & Return
About Rachel Tzvia Back plus selected poems in World Poetry Movement

1960 births
Living people
Israeli poets
Poets from New York (state)
English-language poets
Hebrew–English translators
Feminist writers
Writers from Buffalo, New York
Feminist studies scholars
Hebrew University of Jerusalem alumni
Academic staff of Oranim Academic College
Jewish American writers
Jewish feminists
Jewish women writers
American women poets
Israeli Jews
Israeli women poets
21st-century American poets
21st-century translators
Jewish translators
Israeli translators
Israeli feminists
American women academics
21st-century American women writers
21st-century American Jews